Eduardo Sguiglia (born in Rosario, April 1952) is an Argentine economist, writer and essayist.
 
Exiled in Mexico during the last coup d'état in Argentina, he lives in Buenos Aires since the early eighties. He is Master in social sciences and he was a professor and researcher at the University of Buenos Aires.

Sguiglia published short stories and novels - Fordlandia (1997), Do not trust me, if your heart fails you (1999) and A handful of glory (2003), Black Eyes (2010), Los cuerpos y las sombras (2014) - which were translated into Portuguese, English, Italian and German, and were finalists in the Dublin International Literary Award and Grinzane-Cavour. Fordlandia was selected one of the four best works of fiction by The Washington Post (2000). The New York Times finds his work "reminiscent of the work of Conrad or Kafka, in which, faced with the extremes of an indifferent universe, human beings must come to terms with their own capricious inner landscapes(...)". His latest novel is titled El miedo te come el alma. Sguiglia was narrative jury in Casa de las Américas (Cuba) and Casa del Teatro (Dominican Republic). On 2016 he was one of the seven latinamerican creators who received the Fundación Jumex and Rockefeller Foundation prize. Moreover, he wrote several articles and essays on the economy and society of Argentina. Among others, "Agustín Tosco" (1984), "The Club of the Powerful" (1991), "Infrastructure and Competitiveness" (1997) and "Ideologies of economic power" (2006). In this field he has been awarded two national awards (Arcor Foundation 1993, Roggio Foundation, 1998), and for his work in foreign affairs he was honoured by the governments of Bolivia, Chile and Brazil. Sguiglia had a prominent role in the peaceful resolution of the conflicts that took place in Bolivia during October 2003.

He served in the public sector as president of the regulator of airports, undersecretary of Latin American policy and as first Argentine ambassador to Angola.

References

External links
Eduardo Sguiglia en Narratori 
Eduardo Sguiglia en El Leedor
Acapulco (short story)

Argentine economists
Living people
1952 births
Ambassadors of Argentina to Angola